Koos Van Den Akker (March 16, 1939 – February 3, 2015) was a Dutch-born fashion designer who lived and worked in New York City. During his 50+ year long career, Van Den Akker was recognized for his Koos fashion label (1969-2015) which featured flamboyant idiosyncratic garments adorned with Koos' unique collage work and cuts.

Early life and education
Born Koos van den Akker in The Hague, the Netherlands, Koos taught himself to sew using a simple sewing machine and his first creation was a dress made from a white bed sheet for his sister. With a prolific disposition and a comprehensive portfolio at just age 15, Van den Akker bypassed the 18-year-old requirement age to attend the Royal Academy of Art where he studied fashion and made window displays for a department store until he was 18. Koos then had to spend two years in the Dutch army where his skills were recognized and a workroom in a basement was set up for him where he made clothes for the officers wives and daughters.

Fashion career 
After the two years Koos voyaged to Paris to design window displays for the renowned Galeries Lafayette but realizing he needed more formal training. In 1961, Koos enrolled in L'Ecole Guerre Lavigne (l'Ecole Supérieure des Arts et techniques de la Mode, Esmod) which was located in the same building as the Christian Dior workrooms. Every year Christian Dior picked the most gifted students for an apprenticeship and in 1963 Koos was selected. After three years at Dior and learning every detail about crafting beautiful clothes, Koos moved back to the Netherlands and started his own business opened up his first store in The Hague where he slept in a small room in the back. The window displays were lavish, chic, and theatrical; with influences from American movies such as Carousel and movie stars such as Audrey Hepburn dressed by Hubert de Givenchy. After his father's death in 1968 Koos closed his stores and left for the United States, in particular New York City.

KOOS label 
Koos set up a string of stores including ones on Madison Avenue, Columbus Avenue, Thomson Street Soho, 10th on Bleeker and Beverley Hills, LA featuring clothes from his Koos fashion label. In the mid seventies, Van Den Akker  had a wholesale line with a showroom where major upscale stores such as Bonwit Teller, Saks Fifth Avenue, Marshall Fields, Bloomingdale's and Frost Bros., bought their supplies of Koos'.

Until his death, Koos had a store at 1263 Madison Avenue, New York and a studio in the Garment District. Koos maintained a high profile in New York and LA where entertainers such as Julie & Harry Belafonte, Cher, Elizabeth Taylor, Diahann Carroll and Barbara Walters were clients. After the success of the Bill Cosby Sweaters his success was everywhere with more celebrities donning Koos garments with the likes of Stevie Wonder, Chita Rivera, Brooke Shields, Isabella Rossellini, Glenn Close, Lauren Hutton and NBA stars Isaiah Thomas and Magic Johnson wearing his designs.

Koos was a member of the Council of Fashion Designers of America(CFDA).

Awards 
In 2002, Van den Akker was awarded an honorary doctorate from the San Francisco Academy of Art College as a Doctor of Humane Letters. In the summer of 2008 he became an artist in residence and gave a masterclass for the Academy of Art University in San Francisco and in April 2009 also gave a masterclass for Vogue Patterns in Canada.

Exhibition history 
In 2014, he was one of fourteen designers chosen to be in the exhibition "Folk Couture: Fashion and Folk Art" at the American Folk Art Museum.

QVC

In 1998 Koos started a label for television retailer QVC called 'Koos of Course!' and presented his own show with the collection selling out in 30 minutes. The line continued on QVC until his final show in February 2006.

The Bill Cosby Sweaters

Bill Cosby wore Van Den Akker's wild collaged sweaters on television, further promoting the designer's reputation with the rich and famous. Soon after Cosby was seen sporting Koos' vibrant sweaters, notables such as Erik Estrada, Chuck Norris and Richard Simmons donned them.

Josephine Premice, a singer in the 1980s and a good friend of Koos's, asked him to make a sweater as present for Bill Cosby. She took it to the set of The Cosby Show where Bill immediately put it on and wore it for the taping. It was an instantaneous hit. Cosby then began giving his friends presents made by Koos. Cosby invited friends to New York for a weekend to celebrate his wife Camille's birthday and he asked Koos to open the store on Sunday especially for his guests and told them to choose something they liked.

Inspired Designers

Koos' innovations in fashion have inspired a spectrum of designers from Geoffrey Beene to the Balenciaga by Nicolas Ghesquière Spring '02 Line, to the Marc Jacobs Fall '06 Line. More recently Koos has inspired and been working with Illustrator/Designer Christopher Holloran - Holzor.

Koos on Koos 
In his own words Koos said: "I think of myself as very basic. I am a craftsperson and I sew like that. I sew beautiful clothes. i am nothing more than a worker sitting behind a sewing machine. That's where I feel most comfortable, that's where I am the best. That's what I do best and it's very basic."

Death 
In 1991, Koos' life-partner John Bell died.

Van Den Akker died on February 3, 2015, at the age of 75.

References

External links
of Koos
Christian Francis Roth
Christopher Holloran - Holzor

1939 births
2015 deaths
American fashion designers
Akker, Koos
LGBT fashion designers
Akker, Koos
Akker, Koos
Artists from New York City
Akker, Koos
QVC people